Tianjin Museum is the largest museum in Tianjin, China, exhibiting a range of cultural and historical relics significant to Tianjin. The museum lies in Yinhe Plaza in the Hexi District of Tianjin and covers an area of  about 50,000 sq metres. The unique architectural style of the museum, whose appearance resembles that of a swan spreading its wings, has meant that it is quickly becoming one of the city's iconic buildings. The museum was designed by the Japanese architect Mamoru Kawaguchi and constructed by Shin Takamatsu Architect and Associates.

The Tianjin Museum has an extensive collection of ancient Chinese fine arts and exhibits on Tianjin's history. There are nearly 200,000 collections of art and relics, including calligraphy, paintings, bronzeware, ceramics, jadeware, seals, inkstone, Jiagu (bones or tortoise shells with inscriptions of the Shang Dynasty), coins, historic documents and relics of modern times.

Visitors are not allowed to take photographs.

See also
 List of museums in China

References

External links
 http://www.tjbwg.com Official Website
 https://web.archive.org/web/20081119145526/http://en.tjbwg.com/ Official English Website

Museums in Tianjin
National first-grade museums of China
History museums in China